Karair was an airline from Finland. Initially having offered scheduled passenger flights, the company became a subsidiary of Finnair, mainly operating on holiday charter routes.

History

Originally called Karhumäki Airways, the company was founded in 1947 as a subsidiary of Veljekset Karhumäki Oy, an aircraft manufacturing and maintenance company owned by Niilo and Valto Karhumäki. In June 1951 scheduled services began between Helsinki and Joensuu, Jyväskylä, Vaasa and Sundsvall.  Initially operating on domestic routes with a fleet of four Douglas DC-3 and two Convair CV-440 Metropolitan airliners, the first international flight (to Stockholm) took place in 1951, which was followed by holiday flights to Málaga.

In 1956 the airline was reorganised as Kar-Air OY and started operations in January 1957. A Swedish subsidiary was established, which from 1961 onwards operated a single Douglas DC-6 on chartered flights to Southern Europe. In 1962, Aero O/Y acquired a 27 percent stake in Kar-Air, which was increased to 51 percent over the following years, since Kar-Air had encountered financial difficulties when its two Metropolitans were damaged in hard landings and had to be taken out of service for a period in 1963. The new majority owner demanded Kar-Air to cease domestic flying, concentrating on charter flights (mainly to the Mediterranean) holiday resorts instead. For this purpose, Aero O/Y handed over two of its own DC-6 aircraft, which Kar-Air also used for multiple stopover round-the-world flights.

The DC-6s remained the backbone of the Kar-Air passenger fleet until 1972, when the jet age was joined with the introduction of the 189-seat Douglas DC-8. One DC-6 was re-configured with a swing tail unit for cargo transport purposes and stayed with the airline until 1980, mainly operating freight flights for Finnair to the UK and other European destinations, when cargo flights were taken over by Finnair (as Aero O/Y was named by then). In the same year, the airline underwent another rebranding, being known as Karair, also styled KarAir henceforth. Over the following years, Karair reduced its fleet, because charter contracts with Finnair had been terminated.

In 1986, two Airbus A300 wide-body airliners joined the Karair fleet, which again were leased from Finnair and deployed on holiday charter flights. Finnair's plans with Karair changed from 1989, when the first of six ATR 72 short-haul turboprop aircraft was added to the fleet, and the A300s in turn left the following year. From then, scheduled domestic passenger flights on behalf of Finnair were operated.

In 1990, Finnair acquired further shares to hold a total of 90 percent of the Karair stake, which was further increased to 97.6 percent in 1993. These period saw financial problems because of the recession of the early 1990s, which led to Finnair announcing a full take-over of Karair in December 1995. Subsequently, the Karair fleet and the airline's operations were merged into Finnair, a move which was completed in September 1996. In 2002, a court deemed the take-over illegal, and Finnair was forced to salvage the remaining Karair stocks.

Destinations
 
Between 1950 and 1963 (when Aero O/Y had not yet acquired the majority stake), Kar-Air operated scheduled flights to the following destinations, with further ones accessible on co-operative flights of SAS and Aero O/Y:
Finland
Helsinki - Helsinki Airport (hub)
Joensuu - Joensuu Airport
Kauhava - Kauhava Airport
Kokkola - Kokkola-Pietarsaari Airport
Lappeenranta - Lappeenranta Airport
Tampere - Tampere-Pirkkala Airport
Vaasa - Vaasa Airport
Luxemburg
Luxembourg - Findel Airport
Spain
Barcelona - Barcelona El Prat Airport
Málaga - Málaga Airport
Tenerife - Los Rodeos Airport
Sweden
Gothenburg - Gothenburg City Airport
Stockholm - Stockholm-Bromma Airport (focus city)
Sundsvall - Sundsvall-Härnösand Airport

Kar-Air was not only operating passenger and cargo services, but until also ore-finding flights using a Lockheed Lodestar (until 1972), a Douglas DC-3 (1972-1980), and after that a de Havilland Canada DHC-6 Twin Otter.

Fleet

Fleet of Karhumäki Brothers
Listing of the fleet of Karhumäki Brothers Oy during 1949–2002, according to Tervonen:

Kar-Air Fleet
Listing of the Kar-Air fleet during 1957–96, according to Tervonen (2004, 2007):

Former Kar-Air planes today
The Finnish Aviation Museum near the Helsinki-Vantaa airport had on display two Kar-Air planes, a Lockheed L-18 Lodestar OH-VKU, the “Golden Hoe”, and one of the oldest DC-3s in the world, the OH-VKB. A former Kar-Air DC-3 (OH-VKA), is to be seen at the Munich airport in Germany, however with Swissair registration, although the plane never flew for that company. A former Kar-Air Convair Metropolitan is still flying in Haiti (HH-VAH).

A sister plane of the OH-VKN has been painted in the original Kar-Air livery at the Málaga Airport, for the 50th anniversary of the airport, since OH-VKN was the first plane ever to have landed there. This “replica” is at the Málaga Airport and is owned by the Málaga Aviation Museum.

Accidents
On 13 March 1957 a Douglas DC-3D (OH-VKC) was damaged slightly, when a Pan Am Douglas DC-6B hit the plane's rudder. However, the plane was in use until 1964.
On 8 February 1960 flight KR-100 from Helsinki to Joensuu: a Douglas DC-53 Skytrooper (OH-VKA) stalled while take-off and was slightly damaged. The plane remained in use by the company until 1969.
 On 19 August 1963 a Convair CV-440-98 Metropolitan (OH-VKM) was damaged during landing in Helsinki. The landing took place during a thunderstorm, and the plane bounced three times, and finally its nose landing gear gave in. The plane's nose dove, both propellers touched the ground, and the plane dragged on along the runway ca. 1 300 metres.
The plane was repaired by the following January, and it was used by the company until 1973.

On 21 August 1963 a second Convair CV-440-98 Metropolitan (OH-VKN) was also damaged during landing in Helsinki. The plane bounced three times on the runway, and in the last bounce the nose landing gear suffered a fracture and the left wing was bent. The plane's nose dove and the propellers touched the ground, and finally it plane was dragged to the lawn left of the runway.
One of the factors in both Convair Metropolitan accidents was the policy that the air traffic control employees had been forbidden to give a complete disclosure of the airport’s weather conditions to approaching aircraft. The information disclosed concerned only wind direction and speed, not e.g. possible thunderstorms. The pilot of OH-VKN lost sight of the runway at a critical moment due to torrential rain and a flash of lightning, due to which he could not see for a moment.
The insurance company decided to buy the plane, but in the end it was repaired and commissioned again in January 1967, after it was “crossed” with a similar plane that was bought from Yugoslavia. The plane was used by the company until 1978.
On 7 November 1969 a Douglas DC-3A-214 (OH-VKB) was damaged due to stalling during take-off, when it was supposed to go on an inspection flight to check the ILS system. The left outer wing had to be repaired. The plane was used by the company until 1979.
On 5 February 1973 a De Havilland of Canada DHC-6 Twin Otter was damaged during an emergency landing at Iinattijärvi near Pudasjärvi. Both pilots and one passenger were injured. The right engine had broken due to incorrect maintenance job in Norway.
On 10 August 1974 a Piper PA-18A 150 Super Cub was damaged in Hirvivaara, Juuka due to engine failure during take-off. The plane was repaired and used by the company until 1978.
In September 1974, an Aero Commander S-2R-T34 Thrush Commander was badly damaged during an emergency landing in Hirvivaara, Juuka. The connecting rod of the engine had been broken.
On 14 November 1988, an Embraer EMB 110 Bandeirante the company had rented off to Wasawings was destroyed in a crash in Ilmajoki. The plane had two pilots and 10 passengers. The pilots and two passengers were killed. Wasawings had been breaking aviation rules repeatedly, and in the end their licence was revoked.
On 21 August 1996 an Estonian Air loader was killed, when the blade of a propeller of an ATR 72 (OH-KRC) hit his head.

Legacy
Two aircraft formerly owned by Karair (a Lockheed Model 18 Lodestar and one of the oldest surviving Douglas DC-3s) is currently on display at the Finnish Aviation Museum in Vantaa. Another former Karair DC-3 is exhibited at Munich Airport, though painted in the colors of Swissair.

References

Sources
 Ismo Tervonen: Veljekset Karhumäki — Suomen ilmailun pioneereina 1924–1956. (Apali 2002) 
 Ismo Tervonen: Kar-Air — tilauslentoliikenteen edelläkävijänä 1957–1980. (Apali 2004) 
 Ismo Tervonen: Karair — matkustajalentoliikenteen perinteiden vaalijana 1980–1996. (Apali 2007)

External links

The Karhumäki brothers

Defunct airlines of Finland
Airlines established in 1947
Airlines disestablished in 1996
1947 establishments in Finland
1996 disestablishments in Finland
Finnish companies established in 1947